Giovanni Battista Caracciolo (also called Battistello) (1578–1635) was an Italian artist and important Neapolitan follower of Caravaggio. He was a member of the murderous Cabal of Naples, with Belisario Corenzio and Giambattista Caracciolo, who were rumoured to have poisoned and disappeared their competition for painting contracts.

Early life
The only substantial early source of biography is that of Bernardo de' Dominici's unreliable publication of 1742. De Dominici's statements are often contradicted by documented facts and others cannot be substantiated independently. Archival documents state Caracciolo was born in Naples and baptised on 7 December 1578, as the son of Cesare Caracciolo and his wife Elena. The family lived in the parish of San Giovanni Maggiore.

On 3 August 1598, at the age of twenty, Caracciolo married Beatrice de Mario. They had ten children, of whom eight survived to adulthood.

Caravaggesque phase
 
His initial training was said to be with Francesco Imparato and Fabrizio Santafede, but the first impulse that directed his art came from Caravaggio's sudden presence in Naples in late 1606. Caravaggio had fled there after killing a man in a brawl in Rome, and he arrived at the end of September or beginning of October 1606. His stay in the city lasted only about eight months, with another brief visit in 1609/1610, yet his impact on artistic life there was profound.

Caracciolo, only five years younger than Caravaggio, was among the first there to adopt the startling new style with its sombre palette, dramatic tenebrism, and sculptural figures in a shallow picture plane defined by light rather than by perspective. He is considered to be the solitary founder of the Neapolitan school of Caravaggism. Among the other Neapolitan Caravaggisti were Giuseppe Ribera, Carlo Sellitto, Artemisia Gentileschi, and Caracciolo's pupil, Mattia Preti, then early in his career.

Caracciolo's Caravaggesque phase was fundamental to his entire career. His first contact with Caravaggio must have been around the time of the Radolovich commission, dated 6 October 1606, and the contacts continued through Caravaggio's completion of the Seven Works of Mercy during the last months of that year and early 1607. A notable result of Caravaggio's influence is Caracciolo's The Crucifixion of Christ, with its strong echoes of the Crucifixion of Saint Andrew.

In 1607, he painted the Immaculate Conception for the Santa Maria della Stella in Naples. It is considered to be his first documented Caravaggesque painting.

In 1612, he made a trip to Rome. A work showing the influence of this visit, and especially that of Orazio Gentileschi, is the Liberation of Saint Peter (1615), painted for the Pio Monte della Misericordia, to hang next to Caravaggio's  Seven Works of Mercy painted for the same church.  By this time he had become the leader of the new Neapolitan school, dividing his time between religious subjects (altarpieces and, unusually for a Caravaggist, frescos) and paintings for private patrons.

After 1618 he visited Genoa, Rome and Florence. In Rome he came under the influence of the revived Classicism of the Carracci cousins and the Emilian school, and began working towards a synthesis of their style with his own tenebrism – his Cupid, with its bravura handling of the red cloth, shows the influence of the Carracci synthesis. Back in Naples, he translated this into grandiose, wide-ranging scenes frescos including his masterpiece Christ Washing the Feet of the Disciples of 1622, painted for the Certosa di San Martino. He also painted further works in the Certosa di San Martino, Santa Maria La Nova and San Diego all'Ospedaletto and these works of the late second decade of the 17th century onward, show the strong influence of Bolognese classicism he might have been exposed to in Rome.

He died in Naples, in the few days between creating his last will, on 19 December 1635, and 24 December 1635, when it was opened and read.

Gallery

Notes

References

Bibliography
 
 
 
 
 
 
 
Ferdinando Bologna (Herausgeber) Battistello Caracciolo e il primo naturalismo a Napoli, Ausstellungskatalog Castel San Elmo, Chiesa della Certosa di San Martino, 1991/92
 Stefano Causa Battistello Caracciolo: L'Opera Completa 1578–1635, Neapel 2000 (Causa promovierte über Battistello an der Universität Neapel: Ricerche su Battistello Caracciolo 1994/95)
 Nicola Spinosa u.a. Tres Siglos de Oro de la Pintura Napolitana. De Battistello Caracciolo a Giacinto Gigante'', Ausstellungskatalog, Museum der Schönen Künste Valencia 2003/4, Ed. Caja Duero, 2003

External links

Orazio and Artemisia Gentileschi, a fully digitized exhibition catalog from The Metropolitan Museum of Art Libraries, which contains material on Battistello Caracciolo (see index)

1578 births
1635 deaths
16th-century Neapolitan people
16th-century Italian painters
Italian male painters
17th-century Italian painters
Painters from Naples
Italian Baroque painters
Battistello
17th-century Neapolitan people
Caravaggisti
Catholic painters